The 1902 All-Ireland Senior Hurling Championship Final was the 15th All-Ireland Final and the culmination of the 1902 All-Ireland Senior Hurling Championship, an inter-county hurling tournament for the top teams in Ireland. The match was held at the Cork Athletic Grounds, on 11 September 1904 between London, represented by club side Brian Boru, and Cork, represented by club side from Dungourney. The London champions lost to their Munster opponents on a score line of 3–13 to 0-0.

Match details

1
All-Ireland Senior Hurling Championship Finals
Cork county hurling team matches
London GAA matches